Kapatid was a Filipino rock supergroup fronted by Karl Roy, the brother of Kevin Roy of Razorback. He was also the vocalist of bands Advent Call and P.O.T.

The band was originally composed of Nathan Azarcon (of Rivermaya, Bamboo and Hijo) on bass, J-Hoon Balbuena (of Kjwan) on drums, Ira Cruz (of Passage, Bamboo and Hijo) on rhythm guitar and the late Chico Molina on lead guitar. The band was managed by Pam Lunar. They went on to release their first self-titled LP with hit songs "Prayer", "Pagbabalik ng Kwago", and "Visions" among others, in 2003.

Career
Joined by Karl Roy was veteran musician and bassist Louie Talan (of Razorback), guitarist Anjones Elemos, and drummer Paolo Rosal (of Queso, formerly Cheese). Together they recorded their second album Luha, with carrier songs "Doon", "Psycho Love", and "Sunday Shining" (included in the Pinoy Blonde soundtrack), released in February 2006 and distributed by Sony Records.

Death of Karl Roy
On March 13, 2012, Roy, the band's lead vocalist, died due to cardiac arrest.

Discography
Kapatid (2003)
Luha (2006)
Kapatid EP (2009)

Collaboration albums
The Best of Manila Sound: Hopia Mani Popcorn

Members

Final line-up
Karl Roy† – lead vocals 
Anjones Elemos – lead guitar
Ryan Ventura – bass guitar
Paolo Rosal – drums

Former members
Chico Molina† – lead guitar
Nathan Azarcon – bass guitar
Ira Cruz – rhythm guitar
J-Hoon Balbuena – drums
Louie Talan – bass guitar
Paul Zialcita – percussions

Awards and nominations

References

Filipino rock music groups
Musical groups established in 2003
Musical groups from Quezon City
Musical groups disestablished in 2012
Sony Music Philippines artists